Walter Capellanus was an important cleric and politician in the Kingdom of Scotland during the reigns of kings William the Lion and Alexander II.

Walter was chaplain (capellanus) of King William the Lion, and after the resignation of the unconsecrated Bishop Florence of Glasgow, received the king's support for the vacant episcopal office. On 7 December 1207 he was elected to the see, and consecrated to it at Glasgow on 2 November 1208. In 1215, Walter was one of three Scottish bishops to attend the Fourth Lateran Council at Rome (the other two were William de Malveisin, bishop of St Andrews and Bricius, bishop of Moray). He returned to Rome in 1218, as part of a delegation of three Scottish bishops, including Bricius of Moray, and Adam, bishop of Caithness, in order to obtain absolution from Pope Honorius III for the sentence of excommunication imposed on King Alexander II and the whole Kingdom of Scotland. The mission was successful, and Honorius granted absolution. In 1219, however, Walter found himself in some trouble. A canon of Glasgow, a Master William, told the papacy that Walter's election was uncanonical, and that when he was chaplain to the king, he had given the royal Chamberlain Philip de Valognes 100 merks and a promise to pay the Queen, Ermengarde de Beaumont, even more in exchange for the bishopric of Glasgow. Furthermore, Walter was accused of nepotism and maintaining an immoral household. The Pope commissioned one of his legates, Pandulf Verraccio, Bishop-elect of Norwich, to investigate. Nothing more is heard of the case.

Walter died sometime in the year 1232, sometime after 19 May when he granted a charter to Kelso Abbey.

References
Dowden, John, The Bishops of Scotland, ed. J. Maitland Thomson, (Glasgow, 1912)

12th-century births
1232 deaths
Bishops of Glasgow
13th-century Scottish Roman Catholic bishops
Scottish chaplains
Catholic chaplains